Maestrelli is an Italian surname. Notable people with the surname include:

 Andrea Maestrelli (born 1998), Italian football player
 Tommaso Maestrelli (1922–1976), Italian footballer and manager

Italian-language surnames